Bracongo is a brewery in the Democratic Republic of Congo (DRC) with its headquarters at Kinshasa. Bracongo belongs to the Société des Brasseries et Glacières Internationales (BGI) that maintains breweries in many African countries. BGI belongs to the Groupe Castel, a French company.

Bracongo was founded in 1949 and fused with three other breweries in 1961, then named Unibra - Congo. The company was renamed Bracongo in 1997.
Bracongo's major brand is Skol, a brand also brewed in many other countries. Other beers are Beaufort Lager, Doppel Munich, 33 Export, Tembo, Nkoyi, and Castel Beer. The company also sells other drinks such as wine, soft drinks, and mineral water. Its main competitor in the DRC is Bralima

References

External links

 Bracongo homepage, in French

Beer in Africa
Drink companies of the Democratic Republic of the Congo
Manufacturing companies of the Democratic Republic of the Congo
Companies based in Kinshasa